The Devil Hits Back is a compilation album by British rock band Atomic Rooster.

Shortly after the death in 1989 of Atomic Rooster founder member Vincent Crane, it was compiled as a tribute by his widow, Jean, and former bandmate John Du Cann.

As well as containing a dozen latter-era Atomic Rooster tracks, all its reissues are rounded out by Atomic Rooster's three Beat-Club appearances, dating from 1971 and 1972. The Beat-Club tracks were later included, with video, on the Masters from the Vaults DVD.

It was originally released by Demi Monde Records in 1989 as a 10-track LP and a 12-track CD. Subsequently, it was reissued on the Pilot/Burning Airlines label in 1999, with the same cover as before, but adding the three live tracks. Most recently, it was reissued in 2008 by Plastic Head Records with a new cover, but the same 15-track listing.

Track listing (with spelling and title corrections) 
 "Devil's Answer" 4:04
 "Start to Live" aka "Rebel with a Clause" 2:56
 "Play it Again" 3:14
 "They Took Control of You" 4:48
 "Lost in Space" 5:51
 "Do You Know Who's Looking for You?" 3:04
 "Watch Out!" 4:08
 "Tomorrow Night" 4:50
 "Living Underground" aka "Night Living" 3:36
 "End of the Day" 3:28
 "Don't Lose Your Mind" 3:34
 "In the Shadows" 6:54
 "Friday the 13th" 4:04 - live 1970
 "Tomorrow Night" 4:56 - live 1971
 "Breakthrough" 4:54 - live 1972

Atomic Rooster compilation albums
1989 compilation albums